Commander Sir Henry Fletcher, 1st Baronet of Clea Hall (1727 – 29 March 1807) was an MP for Cumberland in the Parliament of Great Britain between 1768 and 1800, and in the Parliament of the United Kingdom between 1801 and 1802.

Born Henry Fletcher in circa 1727 he was the son of John Fletcher and Isabella Senhouse.  In 1759 he gained the rank of Commander in the service of the Honourable East India Company and was a director of the Honourable East India Company between 1766 and 1784. He established the family seat at Ashley Park, Walton-on-Thames, Surrey.

He was created a Baronet of Clea Hall in 1782.

He was married to Catherine Lintot and they had two children, Catherine and Henry, who succeeded as baronet.

References

External links 
 

1727 births
1807 deaths
Baronets in the Baronetage of Great Britain
Directors of the British East India Company
Members of the Parliament of Great Britain for English constituencies
British MPs 1768–1774
British MPs 1774–1780
British MPs 1780–1784
British MPs 1784–1790
British MPs 1790–1796
British MPs 1796–1800
Members of the Parliament of the United Kingdom for English constituencies
UK MPs 1801–1802